Reza Asadi (born January 17, 1996) is an Iranian Football midfielder who currently plays for Tractor in the Persian Gulf Pro League.

Club career

SKN St. Pölten
On 5 October 2020, Asadi signed a two-year contract with Austrian Bundesliga club St. Pölten.

Persepolis
On 27 August 2021, Asadi signed a one-year contract with Persian Gulf Pro League champions Persepolis.

Career statistics

Honours

Naft Tehran
Hazfi Cup (1): 2016–17

Tractor
Hazfi Cup (1): 2019–20

Persepolis
Iranian Super Cup Runner-up (1): 2021

References

External links 

 
 

1996 births
Living people
People from Gorgan
Association football midfielders
Iranian footballers
Iran youth international footballers
Iran under-20 international footballers
Sepahan S.C. footballers
Naft Tehran F.C. players
Saipa F.C. players
Tractor S.C. players
SKN St. Pölten players
Persian Gulf Pro League players
Austrian Football Bundesliga players
Iranian expatriate footballers
Expatriate footballers in Austria
Iranian expatriate sportspeople in Austria
Persepolis F.C. players